The year 2018 is the 1st year in the history of the Bare Knuckle Fighting Championship, a bare-knuckle fighting promotion based in Philadelphia. The season started with Bare Knuckle Fighting Championship 1: The Beginning. BKFC is available on PPV all over the world and on FITE TV.

Background

Heavyweight Championship Tournament Bracket

 Joey Beltran replaced injured Ricco Rodriguez in the semi-finals.

List of events

Bare Knuckle Fighting Championship 1: The Beginning

'Bare Knuckle Fighting Championship 1: The Beginning' was a bare-knuckle fighting event held by Bare Knuckle Fighting Championship on June 2, 2018 at the Cheyenne Ice and Events Center in Cheyenne, Wyoming, USA.

Background
This was the first bare-knuckle boxing event by Bare Knuckle Fighting Championship (BKFC) and the first sanctioned bare-knuckle boxing event in the United States since 1889.

This event featured the quarter-final of a 8-Man Heavyweight Tournament.

Results

Bare Knuckle Fighting Championship 2: A New Era

'Bare Knuckle Fighting Championship 2: A New Era' was a bare-knuckle fighting event held by Bare Knuckle Fighting Championship on August 25, 2018 at the Mississippi Coast Coliseum in Biloxi, Mississippi, USA.

Background
This event featured the semi-final of a 8-Man Heavyweight Tournament.

The inaugural Police Gazette Women's Featherweight champion, Bec Rawlings, was awarded this title by the Bare Knuckle Boxing Hall of Fame 3 days after her win over Alma Garcia at BKFC 1, making her fight with Britain Hart her first title defense.

Results

Bare Knuckle Fighting Championship 3: The Takeover

'Bare Knuckle Fighting Championship 3: The Takeover' was a bare-knuckle fighting event held by Bare Knuckle Fighting Championship on October 20, 2018 at the Mississippi Coast Coliseum in Biloxi, Mississippi, USA.

Background
This event featured the semi-final of a 8-Man Heavyweight Tournament to crown the inaugural BKFC Heavyweight Champion. The event also featured the quarter-final of a 8-Man Lightweight Tournament.

A planned Lightweight Tournament Quarter-Final matchup between Reggie Barnett Jr and Josue Rivera was cancelled when Rivera no-showed the event causing Barnett Jr to advance to the semi-finals due to forfeit.

Results

References

External links
 Official Website
 

Bare Knuckle Fighting Championship
2018 in boxing
2018 sport-related lists